Cherkaoui (in Arabic شرقاوي or الشرقاوي) is a surname. Notable people with this surname include:

 Ayman Cherkaoui, international jurist in Climate change law, Executive Director of the United Nations Global Compact in Morocco
 Sidi Larbi Cherkaoui (born 1976), Belgian dancer and choreographer
 Rajaâ Cherkaoui El Moursli (born 1954), Moroccan Professor of nuclear physics
 Taieb Cherkaoui (also Taib Cherkaoui - born 1949), Minister of Interior of Morocco between 2010 and 2012

See also
Charkaoui, a variant transliteration of Cherkaoui